The following lists events that happened during 2013 in Ethiopia.

Incumbents
President: Girma Wolde-Giorgis (until 7 October), Mulatu Teshome (starting 7 October)
Prime Minister: Hailemariam Desalegn

Events

Deaths

References